This list contains  game titles released for the Amstrad CPC home computer series. This number is always up to date by this script.

0–9

A

B

C

D

E

F

G

H

I

J

R

S

T

U

V

W

X

Y

Z

See also
Lists of video games
List of Amstrad PCW games

References

CPC Game Reviews by Nicholas Campbell
Amstrad CPC at Adventureland
CPC-power Database of CPC software (in French)

 
Amstrad CPC